is a Japanese male volleyball player. He was part of the Japan men's national volleyball team. On club level, he plays for Sakai Blazers. He announced retirement from volleyball player after the 2022 Kurowashiki All Japan Volleyball Tournament and become trainer of Sakai Blazers.

References

External links
 profile at FIVB.org

1989 births
Living people
Japanese men's volleyball players
People from Okayama Prefecture
Sportspeople from Okayama Prefecture
Universiade medalists in volleyball
Universiade bronze medalists for Japan
Volleyball players at the 2018 Asian Games
Medalists at the 2013 Summer Universiade
Asian Games competitors for Japan
21st-century Japanese people